The Great Synagogue on Wolmarans Street, Johannesburg, is known as the city's mother synagogue and "the crown jewel of Orthodox Judaism in South Africa." All large-scale Jewish events in the Gold City were held in the building, and for all its existence it was the seat of the country's chief rabbi. Northward migration by congregation members led to the synagogue relocating in 1994, to be replaced by the Great Park Synagogue on Glenhove Road, Oaklands, built on the model of the Great Synagogue, whose own architecture in turn was inspired by the Hagia Sophia.

History
The history of the Great Synagogue dates back to the beginning of Johannesburg, specifically to July 10, 1887, a year after the city's founding, when the Witwatersrand Goldfields Jewish Association was founded at a gathering in B. Wainstein's shop. The Association's original purposes included maintaining the Jewish cemetery and offering services to the Jewish pioneers of the city. On September 19, 1887, the first Rosh Hashanah service was held in the Rand Club, drawing a crowd of 500.

Several months after the association's foundation, its name was changed to the Witwatersrand Hebrew Congregation, to better reflect its religious aims. In January 1888, the congregation purchased two plots of land on President Street to build a synagogue. On November 7 of that year, the Rev. Mark L. Harris of Kimberley laid the cornerstone and the work on Johannesburg's first synagogue officially began.

In March 1890, daily services began in what would soon be called the President Street Synagogue. At the time, schisms were forming over several issues in the young congregation. Consequently, a number of members seceded to form the Johannesburg Hebrew Congregation. The Witwatersrand Hebrew Congregation renamed itself the Witwatersrand Old Hebrew Congregation.

President Paul Kruger awarded four plots of land on the corner of Joubert and De Villiers Streets for the Johannesburg Hebrew Congregation to build its synagogue. Since the latter was near the original Johannesburg Park Station, this synagogue was known as the Park Station Synagogue or simply the Park Synagogue, and was opened with great pomp and circumstance by the President on September 14, 1892. The synagogue operated for 20 years and was purchased by the South African Railways and Harbours Administration in 1912, where it was serve as a military headquarters for the SARH regiment until it was demolished in 1928 to make way for a new station.

After the Park Synagogue was sold, the Johannesburg Hebrew Congregation began building what would eventually become the largest Jewish house of worship in South Africa. Between 1913 and 1914, the Great Synagogue was built, covering an entire city block between Wolmarans, Claim, Quartz, and Smit Streets. The large site, chosen by the Jewish architect Hermann Kallenbach, was near the area where most of Johannesburg's Jews lived at the time.

The building was designed by Theophile Schaerer, and the contractors were Hoheison & Co. Siegfried Raphaely laid the cornerstone on September 3, 1913. Sammy Marks provided all the bricks, and had the honor of handing over the key to the rabbi, Dr. Judah Leo Landau, at the inaugural ceremony. Construction took almost a year, and on August 23, 1914, the Johannesburg Hebrew Congregation officially opened its new synagogue under Rabbi Landau.

The two congregations operated side by side for a total of 24 years, from 1891 to 1915, each with their own rabbi and congregation leaders. In 1898, the 26-year-old rabbi, Dr. Joseph Herman Hertz, was appointed to the Witwatersrand Old Hebrew Congregation. He would remain their spiritual guide until he left for America in 1911. In 1903, the Johannesburg Hebrew Congregation asked Dr. Landau to become their rabbi, which he remained until 1943.

For 10 years, the two congregations tried without success to merge. Rabbi Hertz's departure in 1911 and the poor condition of the President Street Synagogue provided new motives for rapprochement, however. Finally, after protracted negotiations, an agreement was reached on May 30, 1915, forming the United Hebrew Congregation with its chief synagogue as the Wolmarans Street Synagogue.

Since its dedication, Chief Rabbis of South Africa would continue to be based there, including Dr. Landau and Rabbis Louis Isaac Rabinowitz, Bernard M. Casper, and Cyril Harris.

Sources 
 The history of the Great Synagogue on their website. URL accessed 14 November 2017.

References 

Religious buildings and structures in Johannesburg
Synagogues in South Africa